Chungkang College of Cultural Industries is a private technical college in Icheon City, Gyeonggi province, South Korea. The current president is Lee Su-hyeong (이수형).

Academics

Three- and four-year programs are offered through the divisions of Games and Animation, Industrial Design, Performing Arts, Information Communications, Food and Human Care.

History

The college first opened in 1996, with an entering class of 720. The numbers have risen steadily since then, now averaging near 2,000 per year.

Sister schools

The college has sought to develop ties with four-year institutions elsewhere in the world, to allow its students to complete a four-year degree overseas. Currently ties exist with the University of the Incarnate Word in the United States and China's Jingdezhen Ceramic Institute.

Notable people
Yoon Kye-sang, singer (g.o.d)

See also
Education in South Korea
List of colleges and universities in South Korea

External links
Official school website, in Korean

Educational institutions established in 1996
Vocational education in South Korea
Animation schools in South Korea
Universities and colleges in Gyeonggi Province
1996 establishments in South Korea